AVH: Alien vs. Hunter is a 2007 science fiction horror film directed by Scott Harper and starring William Katt and Dedee Pfeiffer. It was distributed by The Asylum, and much like The Asylum's other films, AVH is a "mockbuster", or a low-budget film made to capitalize on the popularity of a more widely released film using a derivative of the plot and title of the latter; in this case, it closely resembles Aliens vs. Predator: Requiem (AVPR), a crossover between the Alien and Predator film franchises. Like that film, it deals with a suburban community being threatened by a fight between two warring extraterrestrial beings. It was released straight to DVD on December 18, 2007, one week before AVPR'''s theatrical release, and was met with a large negative response from critics.

Plot
A journalist named Lee Custler (William Katt) is out jogging when a flying object passes behind him and crashes. Sheriff Joel Armstrong (Collin Brock) picks him up and they go to check it out. They find an abandoned caravan close to where the object crashed. As they discover the object and realize it is a spaceship, an Alien emerges. The Alien then chases them, after which Lee flees to the car. However Armstrong makes a stand, trips, falls and is killed by the Alien that then leaves. A terrified Tammy finds Lee and they call the local authorities but their car is destroyed by the Alien.

They run to a local café where they meet Hilary, Javier, Figgus and Marcy who do not believe them. Together they go back where they find Garrison wounded and the other passenger gone. Garrison says that everyone else died. The Alien then appears and kills Marcy, and while the others flee it fights a cyborg-like Hunter. The group decides to go to Valentines, the local hunter, through the sewers. All except Javier, who is killed by the Alien, make it to Valentine's and his daughter Freckle's house where they call for the support of a local paramilitary team. Valentine attempts to kill the Hunter, only to be nearly killed instead, but he makes it alive.

The group then splits up: Valentine and Lee go to meet the paramilitary force while Tammy, Hillary, Freckles, Garrison and Figgus try to escape through a set of tunnels. Garrison gets lost in the tunnels and killed by the Alien but the others make it to the hunter’s ship to their dismay. There they find a second Alien that's nearly dead and figure out that to get rid of the Hunter they need to kill the Alien and take a ray gun from the ship. Lee and Valentine find Two Fingers, Marty and Styles, the paramilitary force, and go to find T and Lexin who are in the woods. But they are already dead and the Hunter kills Marty, and kicks Styles away flying right near the Alien who kills both him and Valentine, who tries to save him.

The few survivors meet and while they try to think of a strategy, Figgus is impaled on a branch and dies. Two Fingers tries to kill the Hunter, who kills both him and Freckles. But just as he is going to kill Hillary, Lee uses the ray gun on the Alien, who nearly killed him a few seconds before, and makes him explode on a giant fireball, which kills him. As the three remaining survivors (Lee, Hilary, and Tammy) head back to town, the Hunter, back on his ship, takes off his mask revealing that he is a human from Earth and this is a similar planet but not the same. The film ends as he comments on the possibility of a second hunt.

Cast
 William Katt as Lee
 Dedee Pfeiffer as Hilary
 Wittly Jourdan as Tammy
 Randy Mulkey as Valentine
 Jennifer Couch as Freckles
 Jason S. Gray as Garrison
 John Murphy Jr. as Figgus
 Kevin Kazakoff as Two Fingers
 Philip Bak as Javier
 Josh Tessier as Styles
 Matthew Bolton as Marty
 Collin Brock as Sheriff Joel Armstrong
 Darbi Gwynn as Marcy
 Aaron Council as the Alien
 Rob Filson as the Hunter
 Josh Hornig as man planting flowers

Reception
Scott Foy of Dread Central rated it 0.5/5 stars and called it "neither fun nor exciting nor scary nor even so bad it’s good".  Foy said that insiders at The Asylum had written to him, blaming Harper for the film's problems.  Writing about films that feature hunting as their primary theme, author Bryan Senn called it "utterly dismal in every respect".

See also
 Alien vs. Predator Aliens vs. Predator: Requiem''

References

External links
 AvH: Alien vs. Hunter at The Asylum
 

2007 films
2007 horror films
2007 independent films
2000s science fiction horror films
2000s monster movies
American independent films
American monster movies
American science fiction horror films
Mockbuster films
Direct-to-video science fiction films
Direct-to-video horror films
Films about extraterrestrial life
Films about hunters
The Asylum films
2007 science fiction films
2000s English-language films
2000s American films